Cyana togoana is a moth of the  family Erebidae. It was described by Strand in 1912. It is found in Togo.

References

Cyana
Moths described in 1912
Fauna of Togo
Moths of Africa